The 2002 Florida State Seminoles football team represented Florida State University during the 2002 NCAA Division I-A football season. The team was coached by Bobby Bowden and played their home games at Doak Campbell Stadium in Tallahassee, Florida. They were members of the Atlantic Coast Conference (ACC). They finished the season 9–5 (7–1 ACC) to finish in 1st place in the ACC. They were invited to the Sugar Bowl, where they lost to Georgia 26–13.

During the season, Bobby Bowden passed Bear Bryant on the all-time coaching wins list.

Schedule

Roster

Games summaries

vs. Iowa State

References

Florida State
Florida State Seminoles football seasons
Atlantic Coast Conference football champion seasons
Florida State Seminoles football